Saúl Mendoza Hernández (born January 6, 1967, in Mexico City) is a Mexican former wheelchair racer, who competed at the Olympic and Paralympic levels.

He acquired polio when he was 6 months old and grew up playing a variety of different sports. At the 2000 Olympic Games, he finished first in the demonstration event of Men's 1500m wheelchair. He finished second in the same event at the 2004 Summer Olympics. He won six medals in different athletics events at the Paralympic Games – 2 gold, 1 silver, and 3 bronze – in a career that spanned from Seoul 1988 to Beijing 2008. He was the flag-bearer for the Mexican team in the Sydney 2000 and Beijing 2008 Paralympic Games.

Mendoza won the Men's Wheelchair Race of the London Marathon in 2004 in controversial circumstances after following a police motorbike through a shortcut on the course near the turn-around at The Cutty Sark, cutting the course short by approximately 200m. He went on to finish the race with a comfortable lead ahead of British athlete David Weir and escaped disqualification. He went on to defend this title in 2005. He has also won the wheelchair division in the Twin Cities Marathon nine times.

The 2008 Paralympic Games were his sixth and final Paralympic appearance, as he had previously announced he would retire from competition after the Games. Online records indicate he competed in the 2012 Paralympics, and is currently active on Linked In, a professional networking group.

However, he returned to the sport to compete in the 2012 London Paralympic marathon on Sunday 9 September having earlier in the season set a new personal best of 1:24:23.

References

External links

1967 births
Living people
Mexican male wheelchair racers
Paralympic wheelchair racers
Paralympic athletes of Mexico
Paralympic gold medalists for Mexico
Paralympic silver medalists for Mexico
Paralympic bronze medalists for Mexico
Medalists at the 1988 Summer Paralympics
Medalists at the 1996 Summer Paralympics
Medalists at the 2000 Summer Paralympics
Medalists at the 2004 Summer Paralympics
Athletes (track and field) at the 1988 Summer Paralympics
Athletes (track and field) at the 1992 Summer Paralympics
Athletes (track and field) at the 1996 Summer Paralympics
Athletes (track and field) at the 2000 Summer Paralympics
Athletes (track and field) at the 2004 Summer Paralympics
Athletes (track and field) at the 2008 Summer Paralympics
Olympic wheelchair racers of Mexico
Wheelchair racers at the 1996 Summer Olympics
Wheelchair racers at the 2000 Summer Olympics
Wheelchair racers at the 2004 Summer Olympics
Athletes from Mexico City
Paralympic medalists in athletics (track and field)
Medalists at the 2007 Parapan American Games
Medalists at the 2011 Parapan American Games
20th-century Mexican people